"ILY (I Love You Baby)" (stylized in all lowercase), originally titled "ILY", is a song by American producer Surf Mesa featuring vocals by Emilee Flood. It was first released on November 26, 2019. When the song was re-released through Astralwerks and Universal in February 2020, it started gaining popularity through user-generated clips on the app TikTok. The song has since topped the Romanian Airplay 100 chart. It further reached the top 10 in Austria, Germany, the Netherlands, Slovakia and Switzerland, as well as the top 40 in Australia, Belgium (Flanders and Wallonia), the Czech Republic, Denmark, Estonia, France, Ireland, Lithuania, New Zealand, and Norway. The song is a basic rendition of the chorus from the 1967 song "Can't Take My Eyes Off You" by Frankie Valli.

Background and composition
Originally just titled "ILY", the song was renamed as "ILY (I Love You Baby)" to make it easier for people to find the song. ILY is a remix of the chorus from the Frankie Valli song, "Can't Take My Eyes Off You". Mike Wass of Idolator described the song as a "chorus on a loop over a dreamy synth-scape that falls somewhere between Petit Biscuit and Kasbo" and praised it as "the perfect soundtrack to any blissed-out moment". Hits Daily Double called the song "the heating-up club banger" version of the original.

Charts

Weekly charts

Year-end charts

Certifications

See also
List of Airplay 100 number ones of the 2020s

References

2019 songs
2019 singles
Number-one singles in Romania
Astralwerks singles
Songs written by Bob Crewe
Songs written by Bob Gaudio